Thierry de Briey (29 December 1895 – 11 April 1945) was a Belgian equestrian. He competed in the individual jumping event at the 1920 Summer Olympics. He was killed in the Bergen-Belsen concentration camp during World War II.

Personal life
In 1940, after the invasion of Belgium by German forces, de Briey became a member of the Belgian Resistance. He was arrested in February 1944 and was first deported to Buchenwald and then Harzungen. After the evacuation of the latter camp, de Briey was forced to march to the Bergen-Belsen camp on foot; he died in the camp on 25 April 1945.

References

External links
 

1895 births
1945 deaths
Belgian male equestrians
Olympic equestrians of Belgium
Equestrians at the 1920 Summer Olympics
Sportspeople from Brussels
Belgian people who died in Bergen-Belsen concentration camp
Belgian resistance members
Resistance members who died in Nazi concentration camps
Buchenwald concentration camp survivors